An Sung-hun (born 11 September 1982) is a South Korean footballer who played as a midfielder for FC Seoul (then known as Anyang LG Cheetahs) and Incheon United in the K League. When he was in FC Seoul, He appeared on friendly match with France national football team during 2002 FIFA World Cup in GS Champions Park (France team training camp). He was played as temporary France national team player for Patrick Vieira.

References

External links 

An Sung-hun at n-league.net

Korea National League players
Gangneung City FC players
1982 births
Living people
South Korean footballers
FC Seoul players
Incheon United FC players
K League 1 players
Sportspeople from North Jeolla Province
Sportspeople from Incheon
Association football midfielders